Abraham Reif (1802–1859) was a Galician Jewish poet.

Born in Mościska in 1802, he came early under the influence of the school of the Me'assefim, but subsequently broke away from the movement. Tobias Feder deeply influenced his literary work. Alexander Langbank introduced Reif to the secular sciences, and after Reif's death he purchased from his widow, Yente, all his posthumous works.

Reif open a school for the study of the Torah and the Hebrew language in his native city, which produced a number of prominent Hebraists. His chief dramas, Ha-Nidka'im, Shulamit, and Yehudit, vividly portray the life of the Galician Jews. As he was too poor to publish his works, he gave manuscript copies of them to his pupils.

References
 

1802 births
1859 deaths
19th-century Jews
19th-century poets
Hebrew-language poets
Jews from Galicia (Eastern Europe)
People of the Haskalah
People from Mostyska